Daniel Nestor and Édouard Roger-Vasselin were the defending champions, but chose not to participate together. Nestor played alongside Aisam-ul-Haq Qureshi, but lost in the first round to Rohan Bopanna and Donald Young. Roger-Vasselin teamed up with Steve Johnson, but lost in the first round to Jamie Murray and Bruno Soares.

Henri Kontinen and John Peers won the title, defeating Łukasz Kubot and Marcelo Melo in the final, 7–6(7–5), 6–4.

Seeds

Draw

Qualifying

Seeds

Qualifiers
  James Cerretani /  Marc Polmans

Qualifying draw

References
 Main Draw
 Qualifying Draw

Citi Open - Men's Doubles